Silver Strand is a 1995 action/drama/romance film starring Nicollette Sheridan, Gil Bellows, Jennifer O'Neill, Jay O. Sanders, Tony Plana and Wolfgang Bodison. It was directed by George Miller and written by Douglas Day Stewart. The story follows Class 195 through United States Navy SEAL selection and training known as Basic Underwater Demolition/SEAL (BUD/S). Brian Del Piso (Gil Bellows) falls for the wife of his commanding officer, Lucas Hughes (Jay O. Sanders). Michelle Hughes (Nicollette Sheridan) was a Navy brat and is now Lucass wife.

External links

1995 films
1990s action films
1995 romantic drama films
Films with screenplays by Douglas Day Stewart
Films directed by George T. Miller